The 1998 California lieutenant gubernatorial election occurred on November 3, 1998. The primary elections took place on June 2, 1998. State Assemblyman and Speaker of the Assembly Cruz Bustamante, the Democratic nominee, decisively defeated the Republican nominee, State Senator Tim Leslie, to succeed the incumbent Gray Davis, who chose not to seek re-election in favor of running for governor.

Primary Results
Final results from the Secretary of State of California

Democratic

Candidates 

 Cruz Bustamante, Speaker of the California State Assembly
 Tony Miller, Former Acting Secretary of State
 Larry K. Reed

Republican

Candidates 

 Tim Leslie, State Senator
 Noel Hentschel, Businessman
 Dick Mountjoy, State Senator
 Ingrid Lundberg

Peace and Freedom

Others

General election results
Final results from the Secretary of State of California

Results by county
Final results from the Secretary of State of California.

See also
California state elections, 1998
State of California
Lieutenant Governor of California
List of Lieutenant Governors of California

References

External links
VoteCircle.com Non-partisan resources & vote sharing network for Californians
Information on the elections from California's Secretary of State

1998 California elections
1998